Suomen huippumalli haussa is a Finnish reality show based on America's Next Top Model. The series premiered on 6 April 2008, on the Finnish channel Nelonen. The show is produced by FremantleMedia.

The winner of cycle one, Ani Alitalo, was awarded a €25,000 contract with Paparazzi Model Management, the front cover of Finnish Cosmopolitan and became a spokesperson for Max Factor. The winners of cycles two (Nanna Grundfeldt) and three (Jenna Kuokkanen) also won the same awards, however, there was no announced cash prize for the modeling contract, and there were two additional casting trips to Milan for Grundfeldt, and a trip to New York for Kuokkanen as part of the prize.

Show format

As on the American version of the show, each episode at least one reward challenge and at least one photo shoot take place, with one contestant eliminated at the end. The elimination process follows the same format as on the American version. This includes a call-out order based on each contestant's performance, and the two worst-performing contestants in danger of elimination (bottom two). In some cases, double eliminations and non-eliminations have taken place by consensus of the judging panel. Also, as on the American version the contestants receive sporadic "Anne mail" (Annepostia or posti Annelta) with hints for upcoming challenges. Each episode a guest judge sits on the panel.

Differences from the original series

Unlike on the American version, which generally has 13 or 14 contestants, the Finnish series begins with only 11 or 12 models.

There are fewer reward challenges, or challenges with winners but no reward. In the early cycles there were more photo shoots than on the American version, usually two per episode.

The finalists do not participate in a fashion show at the end of the competition. The final decision is based solely on the contestants’ photo portfolio and overall performance during the competition.

Since cycle 6, male participants were allowed to apply introducing a co-ed edition.

Judges

Cycles

See also
 Mallikoulu (Model School), another Finnish modelling competition, which aired in 2005, 2006 and 2015.

External links
Nelonen homepage (in Finnish)
Nelonen homepage (in English)
Suomen huippumalli haussa homepage

 
2008 Finnish television series debuts
Finnish reality television series
Finnish television series based on American television series
Nelonen original programming
Liv (TV channel) original programming